"Promise Keeper" is a song performed by American contemporary Christian singer Hope Darst. The song was released to Christian radio in the United States on December 26, 2020, as the second single from her debut studio album, Peace Be Still (2020). Darst co-wrote the song with Andrew Holt and Mia Fieldes. Jonathan Smith produced the single.

"Promise Keeper" peaked at No. 26 on the US Hot Christian Songs chart. "Promise Keeper" received a nomination for the GMA Dove Award Inspirational Recorded Song of the Year at the 2021 GMA Dove Awards.

Background
Hope Darst initially released "Promise Keeper" alongside the song "Set Free" as the promotional singles in the lead-up to the release of her debut studio album, Peace Be Still (2020), on July 10, 2020. On November 6, 2020, the radio team of Fair Trade Services announced that "Promise Keeper" will be serviced to Christian radio in the United States, the official add date for the single slated on December 26, 2020. Darst shared the story behind the song, saying:

Composition

Accolades

Music videos
The official lyric video of "Promise Keeper" was published on Hope Darst's YouTube channel on July 10, 2020. The official audio video of the song was published on YouTube on July 15, 2020.

Charts

Release history

References

External links
 

2020 songs
2020 singles
Songs written by Ethan Hulse
Contemporary Christian songs